Elektra Vavra King is a character and one of the two main antagonists in the James Bond film The World Is Not Enough, played by actress Sophie Marceau.

In the film
Elektra is the daughter of Scottish oil magnate Sir Robert King and his Azerbaijani wife. Her father had acquired her mother's oil wealth and merged it into his own construction business, forming King Enterprises. 

As a teenager, Elektra was kidnapped by Victor "Renard" Zokas, a terrorist and former KGB agent. On the advice of M, a family friend, Sir Robert refused to pay the ransom.

Elektra was embittered, and became Renard's lover. She joined in Renard's extortion scheme and mutilated her own ear to send to her father. James Bond speculates that, after her kidnapping, she was suffering from Stockholm syndrome. 

In the film, she and Renard kill Sir Robert and attempt to blow up her family's oil pipeline as part of an elaborate plan to steal his fortune. Elektra impresses Bond by brazenly betting one million dollars on a card game and shrugging it off when she loses. They briefly become lovers, before she and Renard kidnap him, along with M and nuclear physicist Christmas Jones. 

Elektra mortally wounds Bond's erstwhile ally Valentin Zukovsky, and then tortures Bond with a garrote. Zukovsky frees Bond as he dies, and Bond holds Elektra at gunpoint, ordering her to call off Renard from firing a nuclear missile at the pipeline. Elektra taunts Bond, saying, "You won't kill me - you would miss me," and tells Renard to fire the missile. Bond then shoots her dead, saying "I never miss." He then also kills Renard.

Portrayal
Marceau's portrayal of Elektra earned her a nomination for Best Actress at the 2000 Empire Awards.

The film's costume designer, Lindy Hemming, highlighted Elektra's exoticism by "adorning her in luxuriant textiles".

Analysis

Kirsten Smith suggests that "Elektra holds some of the characteristics of the femme fatale displayed in her clothing choices, her quest for power over all the men in her life, and her ability to use sex to enhance her position." Smith goes on to say, however, that Elektra is also a "damaged and complex woman trying to redeem her mother's name and cultural heritage."

Dean Kowalski notes that while we are led to believe Renard is the main villain of the film, Elektra is actually the "brains and evil heart of the operation". Kowalski concludes that "Elektra's attitudes and behavior are reminiscent of the yin force and exactly what we would expect of a strong (even if misguided) female character."

References

Bond girls
Bond villains
Female characters in film
Film characters introduced in 1999
Female film villains
Fictional Azerbaijani people
Film supervillains
Female supervillains
Fictional terrorists
Fictional business executives
Fictional patricides
Fictional gamblers
Fictional socialites